Oxychloris is a genus of Australian plants in the grass family . The only known species is Oxychloris scariosa.

References

Chloridoideae
Monotypic Poaceae genera
Endemic flora of Australia